Matthew Klotz (born 24 May 1996) is an American male deaf swimmer who represents United States at the Deaflympics and other international events including the Deaf World Championships. He is a world record holder in swimming for deaf and is considered one of the finest deaf swimmers to represent USA after the retirements of Marcus Titus and Reed Gershwind.

Career 
He came to limelight after taking part at the 2013 Summer Deaflympics which was held in Bulgaria, claiming 2 gold medals in 100m backstroke and in 200m backstroke events along with a bronze in the 400m individual medley category. He continued his Deaflympic career success with a medal haul of 5 including 3 gold medals in 50m, 100m as well as in 200m backstroke events during the 2017 Summer Deaflympics.

He notably shattered two deaf world records during the 2018 US National Swimming Championship including his own established record in men's 50m backstroke event which he achieved it at the 2017 Summer Deaflympics with a timing of 26.26 seconds, which was his previous record. He managed to re-establish his own world record in 50m backstroke with a timing of 19.77 seconds and became first ever deaf swimmer to swim 50m backyard within 20 seconds. He also broke the deaf world record in the men's 50m freestyle event clocking 23.14 seconds surpassing fellow veteran US national Marcus Titus record of 23.34 seconds. He is also a national record holder in 200m freestyle, 500m freestyle, 100m backstroke and in 200m backstroke categories.

In December 2018, was awarded the ICSD Deaf Sportsman of the Year by International Committee of Sports for the Deaf for his outstanding performances at deaf sporting events including the world records that he set in both 50m backstroke and 50m freestyle events. He was qualified to compete at the 2019 ICSD World Deaf Swimming Championships which will be held in São Paulo, Brazil.

References 

Deaf swimmers
Living people
1996 births
American male swimmers
Swimmers from California
American deaf people